Another Day may refer to:

Albums 
 Another Day (Steve Ashley album)
 Another Day (The Hurt Process album)
 Another Day (Lene Marlin album)
 Another Day (Oscar Peterson album)
 Another Day (Racoon album)
 Another Day (Solas album)
 Another Day (Yoo Seung-jun album)

Songs 
 "Another Day" (Dream Theater song)
 "Another Day" (Lemar song)
 "Another Day" (Modestep and Popeska song)
 "Another Day" (Paul McCartney song)
 "Another Day" (Roy Harper song)
 "Another Day" (U2 song)
 "Another Day" (Whigfield song)
 "(I Can't Make It) Another Day", by Michael Jackson and Lenny Kravitz
 "Another Day", by Air from Talkie Walkie
 "Another Day", by Amy Diamond from This Is Me Now
 "Another Day", by Bryan Adams from Into the Fire
 "Another Day", by Buckshot LeFonque from Music Evolution
 "Another Day", by The Cure from Three Imaginary Boys
 "Another Day", by Cut_ from Millionairhead
 "Another Day", by Galaxie 500 from On Fire
 "Another Day", by James Taylor from Hourglass
 "Another Day", by Jamie Lidell from Jim
 "Another Day", by Lodestar
 "Another Day", by Nine Days from the soundtrack to the film Summer Catch
 "Another Day", by Paramore, an unreleased demo
 "Another Day", by Pomplamoose from their EP 3 New Songs Woot!
 "Another Day", by The Rutles from The Rutles
 "Another Day", by Screaming Jets from Heart of the Matter
 "Another Day", by Sophie Ellis-Bextor from Shoot from the Hip
 "Another Day", by The Spencer Davis Group from Living in a Back Street
 "Another Day", by Status Quo from Heavy Traffic
 "Another Day", by Sting, the B-side to "If You Love Somebody Set Them Free"
 "Another Day", by Stray Kids from Go Live
 "Another Day", by Telepopmusik from Angel Milk
 "Another Day (That Time Forgot)", a song by Neil Diamond and Natalie Maines from Diamond's album Home Before Dark

Film and television 
 Another Day (2001 film)
 Another Day (short film)
 Another Day (TV series), a 1978 American situation comedy starring David Groh and Joan Hackett

Other uses 
 Another Day (novel), by David Levithan
 "Another Day", a scene from the musical Rent

See also
 Another Day, Another Life, an album by Bomb Factory
 Another Day/Another Dollar, an EP by Gang of Four
 Die Another Day, a 2002 film in the James Bond series
 Another Day in Paradise (disambiguation)